"Hasta Que Dios Diga" is a song by Puerto Rican rappers Anuel AA and Bad Bunny and was released on May 29, 2020, as the fifth single from his second studio album Emmanuel.

Music video 
The video was released on May 29, 2020, and has so far garnered over 347 million views. It was filmed in Puerto Rico and Miami, Florida.

Charts

Weekly charts

Year-end charts

Certifications

References 

2020 singles
2020 songs
Anuel AA songs
Bad Bunny songs
Songs written by Anuel AA
Songs written by Bad Bunny
Spanish-language songs
Number-one singles in Spain